Centrophantes is a genus of European dwarf spiders that was first described by F. Miller & A. Polenec in 1975.  it contains only two species: C. crosbyi and C. roeweri.

See also
 List of Linyphiidae species

References

Araneomorphae genera
Linyphiidae